Zhitnitsa is a village in Chernoochene Municipality, Kardzhali Province, southern Bulgaria.

References

Villages in Kardzhali Province